José Domingo Drummond Cooper (14 April 1957 – 23 January 2002) was a Honduran footballer who participated at the 1982 FIFA World Cup.

Club career
Born in Puerto Cortés, Drummond played his entire career for local side Platense in the Honduran National League, as a defender.

International career
Drummond also played for  the Catrachos and represented his country in 14 FIFA World Cup qualification matches and played in one game at the 1982 FIFA World Cup.

Death
He died at the age of 44.

References

1957 births
2002 deaths
People from Puerto Cortés
Association football defenders
Honduran footballers
Honduras international footballers
1982 FIFA World Cup players
Platense F.C. players